Min County or Minxian is administratively under the control of the prefecture-level city of Dingxi, in the south of Gansu province, China. In ancient times, it was known as Lintao County due to its location along the Tao River.  It was founded as Minzhou (岷州) in 544, named after the Min Mountains in the south of the county. The county received its present name in 1913. In 1985 it became subordinate to Dingxi. Min county is well known by Angelica sinensis which is a Chinese traditional medicine.

Administrative divisions
Min County is divided to 15 towns and 3 townships.
Towns

Townships
 Qinxu Township()
 Shendu Township()
 Suolong Township()

Climate

Transport 

China National Highway 212
G75 Lanzhou–Haikou Expressway (under construction)

References

County-level divisions of Gansu
Dingxi